Wilhelm Roux (9 June 1850 – 15 September 1924) was a German zoologist and pioneer of experimental embryology.

Early life
Roux was born and educated in Jena, Germany where he attended university and studied under Ernst Haeckel. He also attended university in Berlin and Strasbourg and studied under Gustav Schwalbe, Friedrich Daniel von Recklinghausen, and Rudolf Virchow. Although he was trained as a clinical doctor, he spent his career in experimental biology. His doctoral thesis on the embryological development of blood vessels was a seminal early study in biophysical modelling, a milestone in the study of the cardiovascular system.

Career and research
For ten years Roux worked in Breslau (now Wroclaw), becoming director of his own Institute of Embryology in 1879. He was professor at Innsbruck, Austria from 1889–95, then accepted a professorial chair at the Anatomical Institute of the University of Halle, a post he retained until 1921.

Roux's research was based upon the notion of Entwicklungsmechanik or developmental mechanics: he investigated the mechanisms of functional adaptations of bones, cartilage, and tendons to malformation and disease. His methodology was to interfere with developing embryos  and observe the outcome. Roux's investigations were performed mainly on frogs' eggs to research the earliest structures in amphibian development. His goal was to show Darwinian processes at work on the cellular level.

Combined with the rediscovery of Gregor Mendel's 1866 paper on heritable elements in peas, these results highlighted the central role of the chromosomes in carrying heritable material. In cell division the cell divides into two halves with equal number of chromosomes which are similar to parent cell and are diploid in nature.

In 1885 Roux removed a section of the medullary plate of an embryonic chicken and tamed it in a warm saline solution for 13 days, establishing the principle of tissue culture which would later be taken up by Ross Granville Harrison and Paul Alfred Weiss.

In 1888, Roux published the results of a series of defect experiments in which he took 2 and 4 cell frog embryos and killed half of the cells of each embryo with a hot needle. He reported that they grew into half-embryos and surmised that the separate function of the two cells had already been determined. This led him to propose his "Mosaic" theory of epigenesis: after a few cell divisions the embryo would be like a mosaic, each cell playing its own unique part in the entire design.

After a few years Roux's theory was refuted by the studies of his colleague Hans Driesch and later, with more precision, Hans Spemann showed that, as a rule, Driesch's conclusions were correct, but that results like Roux's may be obtained after intervention in certain planes. Despite this early lapse into a fallacy of reductionism, Roux's pioneering mechanical methodology was to prove most fruitful in 20th century biology.

Works

 Der Kampf der Teile im Organismus (1881)
 Beiträge zur Entwinckelungsmechanik des Embryo (1885)
 Über die Entwicklungsmechanik der Organismen (1890)
 Geschichtliche Abhandlung über Entwicklungsmechanik (two volumes, 1895)
 
 
 Die Entwicklungsmechanik (1905) 
 Terminologie der Entwicklungsmechanik (1912).

See also 
Cell culture

References

Literature

External links
 

1850 births
1924 deaths
19th-century German zoologists
Foreign associates of the National Academy of Sciences
Cell biologists
German embryologists
20th-century German zoologists